BB3B  was an animated UK children's television series produced by Tell-Tale Productions in 2005. The entire series consists of thirteen episodes of twenty minutes each. It is shown on CBBC in the UK and ABC Kids in Australia. It first went on air in 2005.

It was created by Iain Lauchlan and Will Brenton, who also created and produced Tweenies, Boo!, Fun Song Factory and Jim Jam and Sunny.

Plot
The series centres on the life of twin children, a brother and sister, Lucy and Louie, and their fears about their new baby brother, Billy Bob. BB3B actually stands for Billy Bob 3rd Baby. The plot generally involves a circumstance where the twins suspect the brother as usual of being an extraterrestrial, and they go on a wild adventure trying to prove it and stop him from launching an invasion. The twins are babysat by Chubba, a teenage boy with a fondness for pizza. Chubba often goes along with the idea of an alien brother, sometimes very seriously, and at one point he cracks and tells the parents of the twins plans to build a time machine. The show is set in the fictional American city of Sunnyfield, which is shown as having a central urban area and outer suburban area, the latter being the home of the family portrayed. The twins' grandmother lives in a trailer in the house's front garden.

Details
Each episode begins with the local postman attempting to deliver a piece of mail to the family mailbox. This ends in him being disfigured or attacked somehow by some strange force within the box – for instance, being turned into a fish. He reappears sometimes later in the episode. The first time he appears is followed by the opening credits.

The series is set in America, where, according to the plot, the father's mother moved from Rochdale, a town in Greater Manchester. The children's grandmother has affections for the man who lives across the street, Mr. Wienburger, and there is a running gag in that his face is never visible; the viewer seeing either just a silhouette or the back of his head.

The Sprogs are baby-like creatures who emit green foul smelling gas. The series never features a real invasion, though it does go across the threshold of science fiction from reality when the postman appears during the episode and at the end the Sprogs always appear to be coming towards the Earth, however generally the theories of the twins are disproved.

The song played by Bis is played again during the end credits rather than the opening theme.

Characters
Louie & Lucy
Louie and Lucy are the two eldest children in the Jenkins family and are twins. The twins seem to be of around five or six years old and have a fascination with science fiction and fighting aliens. Throughout the show, the twins are seen playing games which to them they are fighting to defend Earth, but in fact are not and are really playing like a kid would. They make it their mission throughout the show to try to defeat the evil Sprog alien trying to take over Earth; the Sprog in question being their little brother. When not wearing a costume or going to bed, Lucy's clothes are a yellow shirt with some sort of science fiction planet with spikes coming out of it and short pink skirt. Louie wears a blue shirt with a picture of a planet with rings around it, and he wears blue jeans. They both have brown curly hair. Voiced by Teresa Gallagher and Colleen Daley.

Billy Bob
Billy Bob is the newly born baby brother of Louie and Lucy. Billy Bob is a normal baby, but in Louie and Lucy's eyes they see him as a mind controlling Sprog alien whose means are to enslave earth. Billy Bob is simply known as The Sprog or BB3B to the kids, and is called Billy Bob mostly by their mum but she sometimes also calls him BB3B. Billy Bob is always seen wearing a striped green shirt and nappy.

Jazz & Simon (parents)
Jazz and Simon are the parents of Lucy, Louie and Billy Bob, and are often seen tired most of the time having to run around keeping track of the kids and keeping them out of trouble. Jazz does not appear to have a job but is very creative; she is said to be the glue that holds the family together. Simon is an architect whose plans never seem very practical nor work. The kids think that their parents are now zombies controlled by Billy Bob because of their slow mobility due to tiredness. Jazz wears a green long sleeve turtle neck and purple polka-dot skirt and Simon wears a striped red shirt with brown pants. Voiced by Regina Reagan and Gary Martin.

Nana
Nana is Simon's mum who lives in a trailer in the front yard of the Jenkins' house. As explained in the lyrics of the show's opening theme song, she moved from Rochdale, England to America. She makes a point of driving her Mini on the left of the road akin to the British. She is a relatively large woman who has an apparent love for Mr. Wienburger and has gone to extreme measures to get to him. She also has a western set of clothes and loves country music. Voiced by Colleen Daley.

Mr. Wienburger
Mr. Wienburger lives across the road from the Jenkins and is a mysterious man whose face we never see. He appears to have an important job, as most people seem to know him. He is afraid of Nana and constantly hides from her.

Chubba
Chubba is the teen babysitter of the Jenkins kids. He is a teenager of around 15 years old, and calls virtually everyone "Dude". His interests are science fiction shows/movies (anything on the television for that matter), eating pizza, watching old B movies, listening to punk music and hanging out with the kids. Chubba is a laid-back kind of person and goes strange after too long without TV. He gives the kids information on whatever they ask even if he has no clue. His real name is George, as mentioned in the episode, BB Phone Home where he gets a job at NASA. Voiced by Justin Fletcher.

Bis
The theme song of the series was performed by Scottish rock band Bis. Members Steven Clark (Sci-fi Steven), John Clark (John Disco), and Amanda MacKinnon (Manda Rin), along with their fictional drummer, appear at some point in all bar the first episode performing a song relating to the plot (which would be heard again during the closing credits). They turned up to sing in a variety of strange places during the series' run: the roof of a toy store; the back of a truck travelling along the street; the roof of the Jenkins' home; and even underwater in a large tank at the local aquarium. However, Bis played no part whatsoever in the storylines; they never interacted with the show's characters, and the characters never seemed to see and/or hear them either. Bis was also best known for writing, composing and performing the ending theme song to Cartoon Network's The Powerpuff Girls. The songs from the show were later included in their album, "Music for Animations".

External links
 
BBC UK

2005 British television series debuts
2005 British television series endings
2000s British animated television series
2000s British children's television series
British children's animated comedy television series
English-language television shows
Disney Channel original programming
BBC children's television shows
Australian Broadcasting Corporation original programming
Television series by Universal Television
Television shows set in the United States